Senator Katz may refer to:

Bennett Katz (1918–2007), Maine State Senate
Roger Katz (born c. 1950s), Maine State Senate